Diagnostic Health Corporation, based in Birmingham, Alabama, is one of the nation's largest independent diagnostic imaging companies. The company is the former diagnostic division of HealthSouth Corporation. The company has network of 53 free standing diagnostic imaging centers located in 19 states and the District of Columbia.

Medical imaging
Companies based in Birmingham, Alabama
Health care companies based in Alabama